Buenos Aires National Wildlife Refuge (Buenos Aires NWR) provides  of habitat for threatened and endangered plants and animals. This refuge, in Pima County, Arizona, was established in 1985.

Natural history
The semidesert grassland supports the reintroduction of Masked quail and pronghorns. Prescribed and natural fires play a major role in maintaining and restoring the sea of grass that once filled the Altar Valley. Riparian (wetland) areas along Arivaca Cienega and Arivaca Creek attract an abundance of birds. Brown Canyon, to the west of the Arivaca Creek area, is nestled in the Baboquivari Mountains, where a sycamore-lined stream meanders through oak woodland.

Fauna
The refuge is home to 58 mammal species. Among the larger species are mule deer, white-tailed deer, pronghorn, javelina and puma. There are also more than 325 different bird species and 53 species of reptiles and amphibians. Reintroduced masked bobwhite (Colinus virginianus ridgwayi) are found in the refuge.

Occasional jaguar vagrants are reported in the area, which is contiguous with Mexico. Between 2004 and 2007 an old male jaguar was followed by researchers in the area. The animal was called 'Macho B' by the researchers and has been previously photographed in 1996 in the area.  During the study its home range compassed the mountains to east and west of the Altar Valley, which is situated in the Refuge. In addition at least one other jaguar was recorded in the area during that study.

The male jaguar, 'Macho B', is dead. The jaguar was euthanized after being captured on a snare trap.

Access

Most of the Buenos Aires National Wildlife Refuge is open for visiting and research. Guided access is also available through Friends of Buenos Aires NWR programs.

Some  of the refuge (about 3% of its area) was closed in 2006 to public access due to human safety concerns. At that time there was a marked increase in violence along the border due to human and drug trafficking. As of 2010, this portion remains closed; however, the Fish and Wildlife Service reports a marked decline in violence.

Environmental degradation is the most visible consequence of border crossings through the refuge.

See also

 Sayre, Nathan f. Species of capital: Ranching, endangered species, and urbanization in the southwest. Tucson: university of Arizona press, 2002.
 Arivaca, Arizona
 Sonoran Desert wiki-index
 List of largest National Wildlife Refuges
 List of protected grasslands of North America

Reference links

External links
 
 Official website
 Bird Checklists for Buenos Aires Wildlife Refuge
 Friends of Buenos Aires NWR website

Protected areas of the Sonoran Desert
Grasslands of Arizona
Protected areas of Pima County, Arizona
National Wildlife Refuges in Arizona
Landforms of Pima County, Arizona
Wetlands of Arizona
Protected areas established in 1985
1985 establishments in Arizona
Protected areas of the Chihuahuan Desert